The Source is a 2011 French drama-comedy film directed by Radu Mihăileanu, starring Leïla Bekhti and Hafsia Herzi. It premiered In Competition at the 2011 Cannes Film Festival.

Plot
Set in a remote village in North Africa, the story focuses on women who go on a sex strike against having to fetch water from a distant well. The story is an adaptation of the ancient greek comedy Lysistrata.

Cast

 Leïla Bekhti as Leila
 Hafsia Herzi as Loubna Esmeralda
 Sabrina Ouazani as Rachida
 Saleh Bakri as Sami
 Hiam Abbass as Fatima
 Biyouna as The Old Gun
 Zinedine Soualem

Production
The film was produced by France's Elzevir Films and Oï Oï Oï Productions, in co-production with France 3 Cinéma and EuropaCorp. Other than the 64% French investment, Belgian companies contributed 14%, Italian 12% and Moroccan 10%. It was pre-bought by Canal+ and CinéCinéma and received support from Eurimages. The total budget was 7.99 million euro.

Release
The Source premiered in competition at the 2011 Cannes Film Festival on 21 May. EuropaCorp Distribution released it in France on 2 November 2011.

Accolades

References

External links
 

2011 films
2011 comedy-drama films
2010s Arabic-language films
Films directed by Radu Mihăileanu
French comedy-drama films
Films produced by Luc Besson
Films set in Morocco
Environmental films
Italian comedy-drama films
Belgian comedy-drama films
2010s French-language films
2011 multilingual films
French multilingual films
Belgian multilingual films
Italian multilingual films
2010s French films